Elena Torre (born October 30, 1973) is an Italian writer.

Biography
Torre graduated in Modern Literature at the University of Pisa, after training in journalism at some local radio stations. She is dedicated to the printed paper, and works with the Society & Culture page of the newspaper Il Tirreno, and Mangialibri where she deals with book reviews and interviews with personalities from the world of culture, music and entertainment.

References

External links

Italian women writers
1973 births
Living people